There have been a number of creations of baronetcies with the surname Inglis. They are listed in order of creation.

Inglis of Cramond, Edinburgh (22 March 1687)

Created in the Baronetage of Nova Scotia with remainder to heirs male whatsoever

The Patent is recorded in the Great Seal register at NRS C2/70/288 with remainder being to the "heredes mascules in perpetuum" or "heirs male in perpetuity" of the 1st Baronet. The family moved from Cramond Tower to Cramond House in the 18th century.

Sir James Inglis, 1st Baronet (1660–1688)
Sir John Inglis, 2nd Baronet (1683–1771)
Sir Adam Inglis, 3rd Baronet (1714–1772)
Sir John Inglis, 4th Baronet (c.1718–1799)
Sir Patrick Inglis, 5th Baronet (d.s.p. on 24 Nov. 1817) Lived at Sunnyside. Painted by Henry Raeburn.

The title became dormant on the death of the fifth Baronet in 1817. On 4 December 2018 the thirteenth Baronet proved his succession and was entered on the Official Roll of the Baronetage.

Sir William St Clair Inglis, 13th Baronet (born 1942), succeeded 1970, claim admitted on 4 December 2018

Inglis of Gairloch, Ross (22 February 1703)
Created in the Baronetage of Nova Scotia.

Sir Kenneth Mackenzie, 1st Baronet (c.1673–1704)
Sir Alexander Mackenzie, 2nd Baronet (1700–1766)
Sir Alexander Mackenzie, 3rd Baronet (c.1730–1770)
Sir Hector Mackenzie, 4th Baronet (1758–1826)
Sir Francis Alexander Mackenzie, 5th Baronet (1798–1843)
Sir Kenneth Smith Mackenzie, 6th Baronet (1832–1900)
Sir Kenneth John Mackenzie, 7th Baronet (1861–1929)
Sir Hector David Mackenzie, 8th Baronet (1893–1958)
Sir Maxwell Ian Hector Inglis, 9th Baronet (1903–1974)
Sir Roderick John Inglis, 10th Baronet (1936–2018)
Sir Ian Richard Inglis, 11th Baronet (born 1965). 

The heir apparent is his eldest son Joshua Ben Mackenzie Inglis (born 1990). The baronetage is listed as vacant.

Inglis of Milton Bryan, Beds (6 June 1801)

Created in the Baronetage of the United Kingdom.
Sir Hugh Inglis, 1st Baronet (1744–1820)
Sir Robert Harry Inglis, 2nd Baronet (1786–1855)
Extinct

References

Baronetcies in the Baronetage of Nova Scotia
Extinct baronetcies in the Baronetage of Nova Scotia
1687 establishments in Nova Scotia
1801 establishments in the United Kingdom
Extinct baronetcies in the Baronetage of the United Kingdom